The Brussels Open, unofficially also known as Open de Bruxelles, was a professional women's tennis tournament on the WTA Tour held in Brussels, Belgium.  It was first held in 2011, replacing the Warsaw Open.  The 2013 edition was held May 20–25 at the Royal Primerose Tennis Club. In 2014, the tournament was first downgraded from Premier to International status, and was then cancelled.

Past finals

Singles

Doubles

See also
 Belgian Open – women's tournament (1987–2002)
 Diamond Games – women's tournament (2002–2008, 2015)

References

External links

Tournament's WTA profile

 
Tennis tournaments in Belgium
Hard court tennis tournaments
WTA Tour